The 2014–15 Western Kentucky Hilltoppers men's basketball team represented Western Kentucky University during the 2014–15 NCAA Division I men's basketball season. The Hilltoppers were led by head coach Ray Harper in his third season. They played their home games at E. A. Diddle Arena and were first year members of Conference USA. They finished the season 20–12, 12–6 in C-USA play to finish in a tie for fourth place. They advanced to the quarterfinals of the C-USA tournament where they lost to UAB. Despite having 20 wins they didn't play in a postseason tournament.

Previous season
The Hilltoppers finished the season 20–12, 12–6 in Sun Belt play to finish in second place. They lost in the semifinals of the Sun Belt Conference tournament where they lost to Louisiana–Lafayette. Despite having 20 wins, they did not play in a postseason tournament.

Departures

Incoming transfers

Class of 2014 recruits

Class of 2015 recruits

Roster

Schedule

|-
! colspan="9" style="background:#f5002f; color:#fff;"| Exhibition
 
|-
! colspan="9" style="background:#f5002f; color:#fff;"| Regular season

|-
! colspan="9" style="background:#f5002f; color:#fff;"| Conference USA Tournament

See also
2014–15 WKU Lady Toppers basketball team

References

Western Kentucky Hilltoppers basketball seasons
WKU